Boddinale is an international Film Festival for Berlin-based directors that takes place every year starting on the second Thursday of February.

The Festival is eleven days long, with the last day dedicated to an awards ceremony and re-screening of the winning films. Defined as a community festival, Boddinale has no admission fees and take place in three art bars with several screens presenting the program simultaneously in Boddinstrasse, a street in Neukolln, Berlin, Germany.

Since its first edition in 2013 Boddinale has been defined by local media as "the unofficial little sister of the Berlinale" or "the other Berlinale", in reference to the Berlin International Film Festival.

The Festival was established by the art director Gianluca Baccanico as part of the program of Loophole ArtSpace, a venue for independent artists where the Festival.
Since 2019 Boddinale moved its location at the historic building of the Flutgraben e.V.

Awards 

Boddinale presents works from artists that are living in Berlin in five different categories: Feature, Documentary, Short, Animation, Music Video. All the directors are present for a question and answer session after their screening.

A permanent jury board selects a winner for each category that is announced on the last Sunday of the Festival, after the ceremony the awarded movies are screened for a second time to close the Festival. Since the first edition the Winners are hosted for a night in April at Moviemento, the oldest active cinema in Germany.

Jury 

The Jury of Boddinale is permanent and is composed of Nele Fritzsche, Michael Lederer, Sven Loose, Carla Molino, Lorenzo Musiu, Magnus Reed, Franziska Rummel

Winners

2013
 Best Feature - Anna Pavlova Lives in Berlin by Theo Solnik
 Best Short - Vermin by Adi Gelbart
 Loophole Award - Poor, Dumb, Young and White by R. K. Fielden
 Special Mention of the Jury - So Glad I did by Helena Giuffrid

2014
 Best Feature - For a lot of euros more by Alberto Nikakis
 Best Short - Das Meer im Fernseher by Dimitri Tsvetkov
 Best Animation - DonPlusUltra, Im Bann des Doktor Fiese by Marcus Grysczok 
 Special Mention of the Jury - Santoor by Deborah Philips
 Community Award - Hinterm Ostbahhof by Lenka Ritschny
 Loophole Award - Thanks God Is Friday by Jan Beddegenoodts

2015
 Best Feature - Jerusalem for Cowards by Dalia Castel and Orit Nahmias
 Best Short - Kathedralen by Konrad Kästner
 Community Award - Kaptn Oskar by Tom Lass
 Loophole Award - Pawnshop Santa by Mary Ocher
 Special Mention of the Jury - Tiger der Series by Murat Ünal
 Special Mention of the Loophole - Berlin Spricht Wände by Markus Muthig
 Independent Life Award to Barbara Rosenthal

2016
 Best Feature - Buschow by Rosa Friedrich
 Best Documentary - I spy with my little eye by Vivien Hartmann
 Best Short - Murmel by Niels Kurvin, Anton Hempel
 Best Animation - Lucky Strikes back by André Kirchner
 Loophole Award - Berlin way of love by Salama Marine, Matthieu Do
 Community Award - Jargo by Maria Solrun

2017
 Best Feature - "Zwei soldaten" by Paul Hoffmann
 Best Documentary - "Valentina" by Maximilian Feldmann
 Best Short - "The wind" by Johan Planefeldt
 Best Music/Animation - "Hainbach - Miasmatic" by Nani Gutierrez
 Best Music/Animation - "Gelbart - The big sleep" by Adi Gelbart
 Loophole Award - "Keiner findet sich Orangensaft" by Hannah Schopf
 Community Award - "Yalla Khartoum" by Andreas Lamoth & Frederic Leitzke

2018
 Best Feature - "Nur ein tag in Berlin" by Malte Wirtz
 Best Documentary - "Of huge and small" by Artem Funk
 Best Short - "Hostel" by Daniel Popat
 Best Music Video - "ANDHIM - Mond" by Niklas Coskan
 Best Animation - "Compartments" by Daniella Koffler and Uli Seis
 Urban Spree Award - "Dust" by Deepak Tolange
 Community Award - "Hollywoodturke" by Murat Ünal

2019
 Best Feature Tie - "Deckname Jenny" by Samira Fansa
 Best Feature Tie - "Reise nach Jerusalem" by Lucia Chiarla
 Best Documentary - "Anderswo" by Adrian Figueroa
 Best Short - "Sulla soglia" by Riccardo Festa
 Best Music Video - "Lila von Grau" by Julia Grauberger
 Flutgraben Award - "Le Viol du Router" by Juliette Chenais De Busscher

References

External links
 

Film festivals in Berlin
February events
Annual events in Berlin
Festivals established in 2013
Winter events in Germany